{{Infobox cyclist
| name          = Jens Debusschere
| image         = Jens Debusschere 2016.jpg
| caption       = Debusschere in 2016
| fullname      = Jens Debusschere
| nickname      =
| birth_date    = 
| birth_place   = Roeselare, Belgium
| height        = 
| weight        = 
| currentteam   =
| discipline    = Road
| role          = Rider
| ridertype     = 
| amateuryears1 = 2009–2010
| amateurteam1  = PWS–Eijssen Cycling Team
| amateuryears2 = 2009
| amateurteam2  = 
| amateuryears3 = 2010
| amateurteam3  =  (stagiaire)
| proyears1     = 2011–2018
| proteam1      = 
| proyears2     = 2019
| proteam2      = 
| proyears3     = 2020–2022
| proteam3      = 
| majorwins     = One-day races and Classics

Dwars door Vlaanderen (2016)
}}Jens Debusschere''' (born 28 August 1989) is a Belgian professional road bicycle racer, who most recently rode for UCI ProTeam . He was named in the start list for the 2015 Tour de France. In May 2018, he was named in the startlist for the 2018 Giro d'Italia.

Major results

2007
 1st  Road race, National Junior Road Championships
 2nd Paris–Roubaix Juniors
2008
 8th Grand Prix de Waregem
2009
 9th Grote 1-MeiPrijs
2010
 2nd De Vlaamse Pijl
 2nd Paris–Roubaix Espoirs
 3rd Kattekoers
 6th Overall Le Triptyque des Monts et Châteaux
2011
 5th Overall Herald Sun Tour
2012
 8th Omloop van het Houtland
2013
 1st  Overall Tour de l'Eurométropole
1st  Points classification
1st  Young rider classification
1st Stage 1
 1st Kampioenschap van Vlaanderen
 1st Nationale Sluitingsprijs
 3rd Omloop van het Houtland
 5th Binche–Chimay–Binche
2014
 1st  Road race, National Road Championships
 1st Nationale Sluitingsprijs
 1st Stage 1 Tour de Wallonie
 2nd Overall Tour de l'Eurométropole
 2nd Trofeo Palma
 3rd Binche–Chimay–Binche
 3rd Paris–Tours
 6th Dwars door Vlaanderen
 6th Ronde van Limburg
 9th Omloop van het Houtland
2015
 1st Grand Prix de Wallonie
 1st Omloop van het Houtland
 1st Stage 2 Tirreno–Adriatico
 1st Stage 1 Tour de l'Eurométropole
 3rd Nationale Sluitingsprijs
 5th Gent–Wevelgem
 5th Ronde van Limburg
 6th Kampioenschap van Vlaanderen
 7th Overall Ster ZLM Toer
 7th Kuurne–Brussels–Kuurne
 8th Dwars door Vlaanderen
 9th Paris–Roubaix
2016
 1st Dwars door Vlaanderen
 4th Overall Tour de Picardie
 4th London–Surrey Classic
 6th Omloop Het Nieuwsblad
 7th Binche–Chimay–Binche
 8th Eurométropole
 8th Paris–Tours
2017
 Tour of Belgium
1st  Points classification
1st Stage 5
 1st Stage 1 Four Days of Dunkirk
 3rd Clásica de Almería
 7th Gent–Wevelgem
 7th Dwars door West-Vlaanderen
 8th Halle–Ingooigem
2018
 1st Stage 5 Tour de Wallonie
 4th Scheldeprijs
 4th Grote Prijs Jef Scherens
 5th Gent–Wevelgem
 5th Three Days of Bruges–De Panne
 6th Tacx Pro Classic
 10th Paris–Roubaix
2019
 5th Cadel Evans Great Ocean Road Race
 9th Nokere Koerse
 10th Gent–Wevelgem
2021
 5th Heistse Pijl
 6th Egmont Cycling Race
 10th Grand Prix de Denain

Grand Tour general classification results timeline

Classics results timeline

References

External links
 Official profile
 
 
 
 
 

1989 births
Living people
Belgian male cyclists
People from Roeselare
Cyclists from West Flanders